Taylor Lake is a small lake in Gatineau Park area of Quebec, Canada. It is one of the park's smaller lakes. It is located mostly in the municipality of La Pêche and partly in Pontiac, both in Les Collines-de-l'Outaouais Regional County Municipality, Quebec.

External links 
  Gatineau Park website

Lakes of Outaouais